Dāsbodh, loosely meaning "advice to the disciple" in Marathi, is a 17th-century bhakti (devotion) and jnana (insight) spiritual text. It was orally narrated by the saint Samarth Ramdas to his disciple, Kalyan Swami. The Dāsbodh provides readers with spiritual guidance on matters such as devotion and acquiring knowledge. Besides this, it also helps in answering queries related to day-to-day life and how to find solutions to it.

Background
The Dāsbodha was written in 1654 by Samarth Ramdas Swāmi (1608-1681), a satguru, a Hindu saint from Maharashtra, in the local Marathi language. It is a comprehensive volume in verse form providing instructions on the religious life, presented in the format of a conversation between a Guru and disciple. The narration is believed to have taken place in a cave called Shivthar Ghal (pronounced shiv-ther-gaal) in the Raigad district of Maharashtra.

Style
Dāsbodh is written in the verse form known as owi (ōvyā) in Marathi. The volume comprises 7751 owi and is divided into 20 chapters, each chapter consisting of ten sub-chapters. Each of these sub-chapters varies in the number of stanzas, but averages around 30-40 stanzas (ovi) per sub-chapter, with some being considerably longer.

Chapters:

 Hymns in praise
 Signs of fools
 Assessment of Self attributes 
 Nine stages of communion
 Sacred formula of Almighty
 Search for God
 Fourteen Brahmas
 Chapter on Knowledge and Illusion
 Attributes and Forms
 Life flame of the world 
 In the name of world
 Prudence and Renunciation 
 Name and Form
 Uninterrupted meditation
 Soul
 Sun and Dynasty
 Creation and Creator
 Multifacted
 Teaching
 Complete-whole

Contents
Dāsbodh prescribes the path of devotion to God or "Bhakti mārg", and the path of Knowledge or "Jñana Marg" for liberation. Through knowledge, Ramdas clears away all doubts and gives the understanding of one's "True Self". Ramdas also reveals the true meaning and significance of "Discrimination" and "Detachment".

It deals with diverse aspects of human life such as politics, conducting business dealings and taking care of one's body and family life. One of the key messages given by Saint Ramdas is to not be lazy, as he always encouraged aspirants to earn the livelihood in a virtuous manner. The person who is ready to work will always be fortunate. Common man normally does not want to work and expects everything from God without an effort.

In Dasbodh, Samartha Ramdas presents the essence of many Vedic texts. Dasbodh is a manual for life, in the highest sense, and is somewhat unusual among spiritual literature in that it not only expounds the classic themes of discrimination between the true and the untrue and the detachment commonly found in Vedic literature, but also provides a detailed instruction on how to function and excel in society from a place of deep spiritual understanding.

Contained within the chapters of Dasbodh, Ramdas outlines the path of liberation through Devotion and Knowledge. Through knowledge, Ramdas clears away all doubts and gives the understanding of one's "True Self." Ramdas also reveals the true meaning and significance of "Discrimination" and "Detachment." Entire volumes could be written in trying to describe all that is contained within the text. It draws upon ancient Vedic texts including, but not limited to; The Vedas, the Shashtras, the Upanishads, the Avadhut Gita, the Bhagavad Gita, the Rama Gita, the Yogavasishtha, the Guru Gita, and the Brahma Sutras, to name a few. Mainly what is presented in Dasbodh is the voice of direct experience itself.

Dasbodha is an epic written by Shree Samarth. Whatever he wanted to tell the world he has conveyed through Dasbodha in a candid manner. As per the tradition in his times he wrote it in the Owi form. The contents of the book are simple, straightforward and easy to understand. It is so simple that sometimes it seems to be a prose. Dasbodha is divided in 20 main parts called as Dashak each of which contains 10 sub parts which are called as Samasas. The total Owis number 7751. Each Owi is made up of 4 lines. After being blessed by Lord Ram he wrote the Old Dasbodha. One finds the freshness, fearlessness and candidness of a person blessed with the ultimate knowledge just recently in it. After a while he started with the continuation of the work and completed up to the 7th Dashak to which he added the Dashak he had written earlier, called the Dashak of knowledge. Then throughout his life he continued writing for the Dasbodha which amounted to another 12 Dashaks. These were added to the earlier 8 ones and the final volume of the Dasbodha as we know it now was prepared just 2 months prior to the time when Shree Samarth left his mortal body. At the end of the book he has unassumingly asked the readers to study, ponder over, introspect and not just only read the whole Dasbodha.

Popularity
Dāsbodh has been popular for many years in India. Only recently has it begun to receive recognition in the West. Dāsbodh is recommended by the Inchegeri Sampradaya, including Shri Siddharameshwar Maharaj.

Translations
Dāsbodh has been translated into many Indian and other languages including German, English, Hindi, Tamil, Telugu, Kannada, Gujrathi and Sindhi.

 Sanskrit
 Hindi (four different authors (Chitrashala press Poona copy, Bharatiya Vidya Bhavan, Mumbai, copy, Hindi Sahitya Kutir, Banaras copy and Quills Ink)) 
 
 Telugu (Sundaraiyya vidnyan kendram copy and Vedavyas Mudraksharshala chittur copy)
 Kannada
 Tamil
 Sindhi
 English (four different authors)

References

External links

 An English translation of the Dāsbodh (PDF) http://www.sadgurubhagwanshreedharswamimaharaj.com/Dāsbodh.pdf 
 Online library containing Dāsbodh in various languages and other literature by Samarth Ramdas Swami
 Shri Dasbodh of Shri Samartha Ramdas (Original Marathi) - Free Download at archive.org
 Ranjit Maharaj tells about the use of the  Dasbodh
 Inchegiri Navnath Sadguru Ramakant Maharaj, Ranjit Maharaj, Nisargadatta, Siddharameshwar Talk on enormous value of Dasbodh (Telegram Channel dedicated to Masters)

Hindu texts
1654 books
17th-century Indian books
Advait Mat
Advaita
Marathi-language literature
Books about spirituality
Inchegeri Sampradaya